A baray is an artificial body of water which is a common element of the architectural style of the Khmer Empire of Southeast Asia. The largest are the East Baray and West Baray in the Angkor area, each rectangular in shape, oriented east-west and measuring roughly five by one and a half miles. Historians are divided on the meaning and functions of barays. Some believe that they were primarily spiritual in purpose, symbolizing the Sea of Creation surrounding Mount Meru, font of the Hindu cosmos. Others have theorized that they held water for irrigation of fields. Others believe that it was used to store water, the current most popular theory. It is possible that the function was a combination of these explanations, or others.  

The building of barays might have originated from the tradition of building large reservoirs called dighi in Eastern India.

See also
 Srah and baray
 Temple tank 

Archaeological sites in Cambodia
Hindu temples in Cambodia